Sergio Petrelli (born July 27, 1944 in Ascoli Piceno) is a former Italian professional footballer who played as a defender.
He played for 8 seasons (138 games, 10 goals) in the Serie A for Hellas Verona F.C., A.S. Roma and S.S. Lazio.

During the season when he won the championship with Lazio, on the night before the Derby della Capitale game against A.S. Roma, some Roma fans went to the hotel where Lazio players were staying and began to make noise to disrupt Lazio's sleep. Petrelli was one of the players who fired some gunshots at the streetlights to scare them away. Petrelli previously played for Roma and even scored a goal for them in a previous edition of Derby della Capitale.

Honours
Lazio
 Serie A: 1973–74

References

1944 births
Living people
Italian footballers
Serie A players
Pisa S.C. players
Hellas Verona F.C. players
A.S. Roma players
S.S. Lazio players
A.C. Ancona players
L'Aquila Calcio 1927 players
Association football defenders